Castleton is the name of two places in the U.S. state of New York:

Castleton, Staten Island, a former town in the U.S. state of New York
Castleton-on-Hudson, New York (locally referred to as Castleton)